Benady is a Sephardic Jewish surname. Notable people with the surname include:

Sam Benady, Gibraltarian writer
Tito Benady, Gibraltarian historian

References

Sephardic surnames